Otway Curry (March 26, 1804 – February 15, 1855) was a journalist, poet and legislator in the U.S. State of Ohio.

Biography

Otway Curry was born in Greenfield, Highland County, Ohio. At age 7, in 1811, his family moved to Pleasant Valley, Union County, Ohio. During the War of 1812, his education was interrupted when his father was elected to the Ohio House of Representatives in the then capital of Chillicothe, and his older brother joined the army, leaving Otway at home with his mother. In 1823 he moved to Lebanon, Ohio to learn the carpenter trade, practiced that occupation and began publishing poetry, at times out of state, until 1829, when he began to farm in Union County.

In 1836 and 1837, Curry was elected to the Ohio House of Representatives. In 1838 he was editor of the short-lived Columbus monthly magazine Hesperian, and in 1839 began study of law at Marysville, Ohio.

Harrison Campaign

Curry was an eager supporter of the 1840 Whig candidate for president, William Henry Harrison of Ohio. Campaign songs were a part of campaigning in those days. Two songs from the Harrison campaign of 1840 survived: The Rollicking Tippecanoe and Tyler Too, by Alexander Ross of Zanesville, and Curry's quieter The Buckeye Cabin Song, which some sources claim helped lead to Ohio's nickname as the Buckeye State:

Later life

Curry was again elected to the Ohio Legislature in 1842. He also bought the Green County Torchlight in Xenia, Ohio that year. He returned to Marysville in 1845, and practiced as a lawyer. He was elected a delegate to Ohio's second Constitutional Convention in 1850, and moved to Chillicothe in 1853, where he purchased the Scioto Gazette, and edited it for a year, until failing health prompted a move back to Marysville, where he died in 1855.

While working as a carpenter, Curry met and married Mary Noteman. He was a Methodist by faith, and a bishop wrote of him "as a man without a spot in his character, of strong domestic nature, whose home to him was a paradise: - a man of fervent piety, and his poetry as the song of a religious soul : a faith that brings heaven nearer to earth and man into fellowship with the angels."

Notes

References

 : has a different arrangement of the song

External links

People from Marysville, Ohio
Ohio Whigs
19th-century American politicians
Members of the Ohio House of Representatives
1855 deaths
1804 births
Ohio lawyers
19th-century American newspaper publishers (people)
Ohio Constitutional Convention (1850)
Methodists from Ohio
People from Greenfield, Ohio
19th-century American journalists
American male journalists
19th-century American male writers
Journalists from Ohio
People from Plain City, Ohio